Game of Talents is an American game show that aired on Fox from March 10 to May 25, 2021. It is an adaptation of the Spanish game show Adivina qué hago esta noche. The show is hosted and executive produced by Wayne Brady.

Format
Two teams of two compete in each episode. In each episode, seven talents (such as "Illusionist", "Opera Singer", and "Neon Trampolinist") are presented. Six performers appear, one at a time; one of the talents is a decoy.

The first two performers are worth $10,000 each. The first performer introduces themself, and an image or short video is shown that contains clues to the performer's talent. After viewing, one team chooses to play, and guess the performer's talent, or pass, and force their opponents to do so. A correct answer earns the guessing team the money; their opponents get the money if they guess incorrectly. Each team gets one chance to choose.

The third and fourth performers are worth $15,000 each. Gameplay is the same as the first two rounds, except that the decision to play or pass must be made before the video or image is revealed.

The fifth and deciding performer is worth $60,000. In this round, teams play head-to-head. As soon as the clue is revealed, either team can lock in an answer. The first team to do so wins $60,000 and the game, if correct; if they are incorrect, their opponents win the money and the game.

The final performer is introduced and their clue is shown, as in the first four rounds. Teams can choose to walk away with their accumulated winnings or play. If the team plays and guesses correctly, their winnings are doubled, up to a potential $220,000; if they guess incorrectly, they leave with nothing.

Production
On November 19, 2020, it was announced that Fox had ordered the series, with Wayne Brady as host. Brady also serves as executive producer, alongside Jeff Apploff. On February 8, 2021, it was announced that Game of Talents would premiere on March 10, following the fifth season premiere of The Masked Singer. On May 16, 2022, Fox shelved the series indefinitely.

Episodes

Ratings

Notes

References

External links
 
 

2020s American game shows
2021 American television series debuts
2021 American television series endings
American television series based on Spanish television series
English-language television shows
Fox Broadcasting Company original programming
Talent shows
Television series by Fremantle (company)